Sinclair, Rooney & Co. Building, also known as the Remington Rand Building and Sperry-Rand Building, is a historic building located in downtown Buffalo, Erie County, New York. It was designed by the architecture firm Esenwein & Johnson and built between 1909 and 1911.  The building is representative of Commercial Style architecture.  The six-story, steel frame and concrete, "L"-shaped building is clad in yellow brick and consists of a rectangular main block, approximately 60-feet by 164-feet, with an extension of approximately 30-feet by 63-feet. It features brick pilasters that extend to the sixth floor, where they are capped by ornamental brick brackets and dentil molding below the roofline.  It was built for Sinclair, Rooney, & Co., wholesale milliners, and later occupied by Remington Rand Corporation and its successor Sperry-Rand.  The building housed offices and light manufacturing activities.

It was listed on the National Register of Historic Places in 2016.

References

Commercial buildings on the National Register of Historic Places in New York (state)
Commercial buildings completed in 1911
Buildings and structures in Buffalo, New York
National Register of Historic Places in Buffalo, New York